Waimaw Township (Shan :ဝဵင်းမႂ်ႇ Tai nue:ᥝᥥᥒᥰᥛᥬᥱ เวียงใหม่​)is a township of Myitkyina District in the Kachin State of Burma. The principal town is Waingmaw and other towns are Sadon and Kan Paik Ti.

In January 2017, Waimaw Township was home to two internally displaced persons camps, Zai Awng and Hkau Shau, which were hit by mortar fire.

References

Townships of Kachin State